The third European Team Championships| took place on 18 and 19 June 2011. The Competition was divided between four divisions, with results determining promotion and relegation between them. The Super League event was held in Stockholm, at the Stockholm Olympic Stadium. The Super League was won by the German team ahead of Russia, initial winner before several doping disqualifications, and Ukraine.

Calendar

Super League

Place: Stockholm Olympic Stadium, Stockholm, Sweden

The men's pole vault competition was moved indoor to Sätrahallen because of bad weather conditions.

Participating countries

Men's events

Women's events

Score table

Final standings

Note: After the results of several athletes banned for doping were retroactively voided, points had to be reallocated, Russia losing its initial title. This resulted in the originally relegated Czech Republic being one place higher than Belarus.

First League
Place: İzmir, Turkey

Participating countries

Men's events

Women's events

Score table

Final standings

Second League
Place: Novi Sad, Serbia

Participating countries

Men's events

Women's events

Score table

Final standings

Third League
Place: Reykjavík, Iceland

Participating countries

 Athletic Association of Small States of Europe()

Men's events

Women's events

Score table

Final standings

External links
Overall team standings
Stockholm 2011
Izmir 2011 
Novi Sad 2011
Reykjavik 2011

European Athletics Team Championships
European
2011 in European sport
2010s in Stockholm
International athletics competitions hosted by Sweden
International sports competitions in Stockholm
2010s in İzmir